Richard Ungewitter (December 18, 1869 in Artern, Province of Saxony – December 17, 1958 in Stuttgart) was a German pioneer of the Freikörperkultur (free body culture) movement and one of its first organizers. There was a völkisch element in Ungewitter's ideas.

Career
Ungewitter was of working-class or lower middle-class origins and was trained as a gardener. He became a clerk in the office of a gardening company, then lived for two years in Norway. After returning to Germany, he was one of the founders of a bread manufacturing facility. After that went bankrupt, he worked as a sales representative and a Lutheran minister.

He was introduced to nudism (now known as naturism) by Heinrich Pudor, who published under the pseudonym Heinrich Scham (Shame). Today he is considered one of its early pioneers.

In 1903 Ungewitter published a booklet entitled Wieder nacktgewordene Menschen (People naked again), which made him quite well known. Almost 100,000 copies were printed within a few years. His first book, Die Nacktheit (Nudity) appeared in 1906 under the full title Die Nacktheit in entwicklungsgeschichtlicher, gesundheitlicher, moralischer und künstlerischer Sicht (Nudity from the point of view of historical development, health, morality and art). It was reprinted several times. Repeated attempts at legal procedures against the book failed because the experts invited by the court testified in favor of Ungewitter. For example, Theodor Lipps, a professor at the University of Munich, stated in his report:

In subsequent years, Ungewitter published further books advocating nudism. His best known work is the book Nackt (Naked), which appeared in 1908. In addition, in 1908 he founded the Vereinigung für hygienische, ethische und ästhetische Kultur (Organization for hygienic, ethical and aesthetic culture). This was the second naturist group in Germany, after a club founded in Essen in 1898, and had approximately 50 members, primarily in South Germany.

Both Nackt and his Nacktheit und Kultur (Nudity and Culture, published 1911) were the subject of legal disputes lasting several years, in which, however, he was largely able to obtain satisfactory judgements.  Thus, in its session of April 24, 1912, Criminal Trial Chamber III of the Royal Regional Court in Stuttgart rejected the suit by the royal attorneys to suppress Nackt. This legal opinion of the court, under which illustrated naturist publications are permissible, was followed by all other democratic courts of justice in Germany and other countries.

Ungewitter, like many Lebensreform theorists of the time, ascribed positive health benefits to nudity. He suggested that wearing clothing might be a cause of tuberculosis, and theorized that the rays of the sun were beneficial to health because they contained metals. By his own account, he had suffered from infections, weakness, and a recurring rash despite medical treatment, and only become healthy and strong after, under the influence of Louis Kuhne's theories, he gave up alcohol and smoking and became a vegetarian; ultimately he adopted a raw food diet in addition to exercising and writing in the nude.

Ungewitter founded his first organization, the Vereinigung für hygienische, ethische und ästhetische Kultur (Society for Hygienic, Ethical and Esthetic Culture) in Stuttgart around 1906. In 1907 Ungewitter founded the Loge des aufsteigenden Lebens (Lodge of Ascending Life or Rising Life), to which according to his statement on June 17, 1912, more than 800 people belonged. It may have been the first nationwide nudist organization in Germany. In its regular publication Vertrauliche Mitteilungen (Confidential Reports), members advocated naked bathing free of embarrassment, nudity without being disturbed, and to some extent, long-distance nude hiking. In 1914 the name of the lodge was changed to Treubund für aufsteigendes Leben (Brotherhood or Loyalty Club for Ascending Life, abbreviated Tefal).

In 1923, Ungewitter, who dominated the organization, obtained an amendment to its constitution introducing a commitment to "racial hygiene" (völkisch eugenics) and also requiring a commitment to a political party. Many members objected to the alignment with eugenics, and large numbers therefore left the organization, which subsequently waned in importance. However, the move toward eugenics did not constitute an essential change in his theories. As early as 1910, he had written in Nacktheit und Kultur:

He was specifically anti-Semitic, and was also associated with the völkisch journal Die Ostara. Ungewitter was unusual among naturists in making a close connection between nudism, marriage, and racialism, and advocated compulsory nudity (nude exercises three times a day) together with vegetarianism. In 1919 he had edited Der Zusammenbruch: Deutschlands Wiedergeburt durch Blut und Eisen, which lays out a program for Germany's recovery from the defeat of World War I in which compulsory nudity is an element.

Ungewitter was also notably anti-feminist, arguing that girls should be educated only in things that would equip them to run a household and that they should be required to undergo a year's service including physical exercise, and notably hostile toward the rich, whom he attacked for "status arrogance" that extended to preferring fashionable ailments to health.

After the Nazis came to power, Ungewitter did not find the expected support for his ideas. There was an initial crackdown on nudists in 1933, then those who advocated recreational nudity were accommodated, but Ungewitter, with his pronounced anti-urbanism and advocacy of rural naturist settlements (at least two Tefal settlements existed by the mid-1920s), was forced out. In 1938 he was sidelined with an honorary post. He died in Stuttgart in December 1958, on the evening before his 89th birthday.

Awards and honors 

 1953 Honorary Membership in the Deutscher Verband für Freikörperkultur (German Association for Free Body Culture)

Works 
as author
 Wieder nackt gewordene Menschen, 1903
 Die Nacktheit, 1905. Trans. Tessa Wilson. Nakedness: In an Historical, Hygienic, Moral and Artistic Light. Riverside, California: Ultraviolet, 2005. 
 Diätische Ketzereien. Die Eiweißtheorie mit ihren Folgen, als Krankheitsursache, und ihre wissenschaftlich begründete Verabschiedung, 1908
 Nackt. Eine kritische Studie, 1909
 Kultur und Nacktheit. Eine Forderung, 1911
 
 Rassenverschlechterung durch Juda, 1919
 Nacktheit und Aufstieg. Ziele zur Erneuerung des deutschen Volkes, 1920
 Rettung oder Untergang des deutschen Volkes. Nur für Deutschgeborene!, 1921
 Nacktheit und Moral. Wege zur Rettung des deutschen Volkes, 1925
 Aus Entartung zur Rasse-Pflege. Ein Weckruf in zwölfter Stunde, 1934
 Denkschrift zur Impfung, 1938
 as editor
 
 Der Zusammenbruch: Deutschlands Wiedergeburt durch Blut und Eisen, 1919

See also
 Lebensreform

Notes and references

Further reading 

 Georg Schückler. "Gefährliche Wurzeln der Freikörperkultur-Bewegung. Kirchenhaß und Antisemitismus bei Richard Ungewitter, dem 'Vater der deutschen FKK'". Cologne-Klettenberg: Volkswartbund, 1953.  
 Kai Buchholz et al. (ed.). Die Lebensreform. Entwürfe zur Neugestaltung von Leben und Kunst um 1900. Volume 1. Darmstadt: Haeusser, 2001.  
 Andreas Schmölling. "Lebensspuren eines Lichtkämpfers. Aus Schaffen und Werk von Richard Ungewitter (1868–1958), Lebensreformer und Pionier der Freikörperkultur". Aratora 12 (2002) 16–49

External links 
 

1869 births
1958 deaths
People from Artern
People from the Province of Saxony
German activists
Naturism in Germany
Raw foodists
Social nudity advocates
German naturists